Catch-my-Pal, alternatively known as the 'Protestant Total-Abstinence Union', was an anti-alcohol organisation founded on 13 July 1909 in Armagh, Ireland. The organisation closed down in January 1970 when its last club stopped operations.

Its distinctive feature was that members would competitively persuade one of their friends to come with them and take 'the pledge' at each meeting.  This 'Catch-my-Pal' method  - the phrase was coined by its founder, Rev. Robert Patterson -  was later used to recruit the 'Pals' Battalions to the British Army in the Great War.

History
Rev. Robert Patterson was the Minister of the 3rd Armagh Congregation of the Presbyterian Church in Ireland, who went on to become full-time Organising Secretary of the Union and was later Minister of the Crumlin Road Congregation in Belfast. Patterson was both an Orangeman and a pioneer in the field of Presbyterian/Roman Catholic Inter-Church relations. The movement attracted a large number of followers in Ireland and Great Britain.  In 1914 Patterson claimed that "About 140,000 men and women joined the Union during the first year in Ireland; and almost 500 branches were formed in less than two years'.

While he was on a tour of the United States Patterson told the Springfield Republican about the organisation's founding:

Patterson was a well-known figure at the time, touring extensively in the British Empire and the United States.  His writing was quoted approvingly by the 'baseball evangelist' Billy Sunday.

The organisation flourished in the years before the First World War, in which many of its members fought, and continued in existence in Northern Ireland, Scotland and Australia through the 1950s and 1960s.  While the last actual club closed in 1970, there is a snooker hall in Dunmurry, Northern Ireland bearing the name Catch-my-Pal but it is not a temperance organisation.

A 'Blue Plaque' historical marker was erected on the facade of The Mall Meeting House, Armagh, to Robert Patterson on 20 September 2019 and was unveiled by the Moderator of the General Assembly, Rev. William Henry.

References

External links 
The Mall Presbyterian Church, Armagh.
The Catch-my-Pal Historical Union
Unveiling of a 'Blue Plaque' to Rev. R.J. Patterson in Armagh, September 2019 (video)

Temperance organizations
1909 establishments in Ireland
Organizations established in 1909
1970 disestablishments in Northern Ireland
Organizations disestablished in 1970
Presbyterian Church in Ireland
Organisations based in Northern Ireland